Darwin Brown (born July 6, 1977) is a former American football player. In 1999, he was drafted by the Denver Broncos in the fifth round of the 1999 NFL Draft. He played college football at Texas Tech University and high school football at John Tyler High School.

He was on the John Tyler Lions high school team that went 16–0 and won the 1994 class 5A Division II state championship of Texas, a season that included a memorable regional semifinal against Plano East Senior High School.

He was a member of the St. Louis Rams team during the 2001 season but did not play in any regular season games.

Brown signed with the New York Dragons on March 20, 2002.

He later became a member of the coaching staff at Dallas Carter high school alongside his former John Tyler Lions coach Allen Wilson.

References

External links 
 http://www.nfl.com/players/darwinbrown/profile?id=BRO368322

1977 births
Living people
Sportspeople from Tyler, Texas
Texas Tech Red Raiders football players
Amsterdam Admirals players
New York Dragons players
Players of American football from Texas
American football defensive backs